Will You Wait for Me may refer to:

"Will You Wait for Me?", a song by British singer Kavana
Will You Wait for Me (EP), an EP by American rock band The Colourist